The 2006 San Francisco 49ers season was the franchise's 57th season in the National Football League and their 61st overall. It began with the team trying to improve on their 4–12 record in 2005. Despite having improved from their previous two disastrous seasons, they missed the playoffs for the fourth straight year, continuing their playoff drought.  The 49ers celebrated their 60th anniversary during the 2006 season, because, although it was their 61st season, the 2006 calendar year marked the 60th anniversary of the franchise's founding in 1946.

Off-season
Soon after the end of the 2005 season, Mike McCarthy, the 49ers' offensive coordinator of one year, left for the Green Bay Packers. On January 17, 2006, the 49ers hired Norv Turner as McCarthy's replacement. Whereas McCarthy based the majority of his offense on Bill Walsh's West Coast Offense, Turner has been known to use a power running scheme and vertical passing game more often than the West Coast scheme. Turner came to the 49ers after two unsuccessful seasons as the head coach of the 49ers' cross-bay rivals, the Oakland Raiders.

The 49ers gained the sixth pick in the 2006 NFL Draft after winning a coin toss with the Raiders at the scouting combine in Indianapolis. The 49ers used their first pick on Maryland Tight End Vernon Davis. They then used their next pick (acquired from the Denver Broncos via the Washington Redskins) on North Carolina State defensive end Manny Lawson. The rest of their picks were Wisconsin Wide Receiver Brandon Williams, Penn State RB Michael Robinson, Tennessee DE Parys Haralson, Central Missouri St. Wide Receiver Delanie Walker, North Carolina St. Safety Marcus Hudson, Louisiana St. DE Melvin Oliver, and Arkansas Safety Vickiel Vaughn.

The 49ers had two major free agent acquisitions in the offseason. Larry Allen, a perennial Pro Bowl left guard from the Dallas Cowboys, and Antonio Bryant, a talented but oft-troubled wide receiver from the Cleveland Browns. The 49ers also traded Kevan Barlow to the New York Jets for what was believed to be a 2007 4th round draft pick.

Staff

2006 NFL Draft

Roster

Schedule

Preseason

Regular season

Regular season

Week 1: at Arizona Cardinals

The 49ers opened the regular season against the Arizona Cardinals on September 10. Despite losing 34–27, many positives can be taken out of the game. RB Frank Gore rushed for 88 yards and caught 6 receptions for over 80 yards with two touchdowns. Rookie tight end Vernon Davis and second year quarterback Alex Smith hooked up for a touchdown pass with Smith equaling his touchdown total of the entire 2005 season and passing for an encouraging 288 yards with 23 completions out of 40 attempts. The 49ers had several chances to win it, however, many controversial non-calls were made by the officials, including a blatant pass interference in the end zone, which would have tied the game with just a little over 2 minutes to go. The 49ers would thus start their 61st season 0–1.

Week 2: vs. St. Louis Rams

The 49ers played their second game of the season against the St. Louis Rams on September 17 in a Week 2 home – opener. After a loss to the Arizona Cardinals the previous week, the 49ers redeemed themselves with a win at home. Second year quarterback Alex Smith threw for 233 yards with 11 completions and one touchdown pass to Antonio Bryant. Bryant had four receptions with 131 yards. Running back Frank Gore ran for a (at the time) career-best 127 yards with a touchdown, despite Jonas Jennings and Larry Allen being sidelined with injuries. San Francisco won 20–13 and evened out their record at 1–1.

Week 3: vs. Philadelphia Eagles 

The 49ers stayed at home for a Week 3 contest against the Philadelphia Eagles. From the get-go, the Niners trailed as QB Donovan McNabb managed to complete two TD passes to RB Brian Westbrook (a 4-yard pass) and WR L.J. Smith (a 1-yard pass) in the first quarter. In the second quarter, San Francisco would get on the board with Kicker Joe Nedney completing a 48-yard field goal, but Philadelphia would strike hard, as RB Brian Westbrook ran 71 yards for a touchdown and Kicker David Akers completed a 21-yard field goal. In the third quarter, both sides managed to get themselves a touchdown. Eagles DT Mike Patterson returned a 49ers fumble 98 yards for a touchdown, while the Niners' rookie RB Michael Robinson got a 1-yard TD run. In the fourth quarter, San Francisco tried to come back with Robinson getting another 1-yard TD run.  However, the Eagles got an 8-yard TD run by Westbrook.  The Niners would get one more score, as QB Alex Smith completed a TE Eric Johnson, but that would as far as they would get, as the 49ers fell to 1–2 on the year.

Week 4: at Kansas City Chiefs 

After losing at home to the Eagles, the 49ers flew to Arrowhead Stadium for a Week 4 match-up with the Kansas City Chiefs. Unfortunately, this match-up was one-sided from beginning to end, with the Chiefs’ offense being in top form, the Niners crushed by KC’s defense, and the usual loudness of the stadium (via the Chiefs’ fans) also probably affected the team’s ability to execute. The 49ers tried their best, but in the end, QB Damon Huard and the Kansas City Chiefs were the better team in the fight. 49ers would drop their record to 1–3

Week 5: vs. Oakland Raiders 

Hoping to rebound from their loss in Kansas City, the 49ers went home for Week 5 as they played a Bay Area battle with the Oakland Raiders. The Niners drew first blood with QB Alex Smith throwing a 4-yard TD pass to WR Arnaz Battle, yet the Raiders would respond with kicker Sebastian Janikowski getting a 33-yard field goal for the first quarter. In the second quarter, things started to look grim, as Oakland took the lead with Janikowski kicking a 36-yard field goal, while QB Andrew Walter threw a 22-yard TD pass to WR Randy Moss. In the third quarter, the 49ers would rebound, as Smith hooked up with Battle again for a 6-yard TD pass. Later, Alex would throw a 33-yard TD pass to RB Maurice Hicks, giving San Francisco the lead. In the fourth quarter, the 49ers continued to roll, as kicker Joe Nedney kicked a 19-yard field goal, while rookie DE Melvin Oliver returned a fumble 12 yards for a touchdown. The Niners would allow one last touchdown from the Raiders, in the form of QB Marques Tuiasosopo completing an 8-yard pass to TE Courtney Anderson, but Nedney would help the Niners get win #2 with a 39-yard field goal. This beating of their Cross-bay rivals would bring the 49ers to a 2–3 record

Week 6: vs. San Diego Chargers 

Nothing RB LaDainian Tomlinson does on the ground really impresses the San Diego Chargers at this point. For that, the star running back must take to the air. Tomlinson seemed to be trying to jump out of Candlestick Park while hurdling the goal line on one of his four touchdown runs—and his elevation was the Chargers' inspiration. Tomlinson set a franchise record while seemingly spending most of the afternoon in the end zone, and QB Philip Rivers passed for a career-high 334 yards and two more scores in San Diego's 48–19 victory over San Francisco. Tomlinson got his third score 33 seconds before halftime, capping San Diego's 35-point first half and essentially finishing off the 49ers (2–4) with an astonishingly high leap over the goal-line pile. WR Bryan Gilmore and FB Moran Norris caught scoring passes as the Chargers gave up more points in the first half alone than they allowed in any of their first four games. But San Diego shut out San Francisco in the second half, with QB Alex Smith finishing 20 of 31 for 214 yards. San Francisco's offense has been better than expected heading to the club's bye week, but the defense has been just as bad as feared. Two weeks after giving up 41 points to the Chiefs, the 49ers seemed lost from the moment top CB Walt Harris was ruled out with a hamstring injury. This crushing blow put the 49ers record at 2–4.

Week 8: at Chicago Bears 

Wearing bright orange uniforms and showing their speed on defense and special teams, the Chicago Bears overwhelmed the 49ers who were coming off their Bye Week. They jumped to a 24–0 first-quarter lead and 41–0 halftime cushion before coasting to a 41–10 victory. Brian Urlacher's one-handed interception was headed to the highlight reel as soon as he tumbled to the ground after somehow batting the ball to himself. Urlacher's stellar play symbolized what kind of afternoon it was for the refreshed and still unbeaten Chicago Bears – and how frustrating the day was for the 49ers. San Francisco entered giving up 32 points a game, but the defense wasn't to fault early on because turnovers allowed the Bears to work from short fields. Drives started at the 15, 41 and 13, and they turned all three into touchdowns to take the big opening-quarter lead. The 49ers coughed up the ball a fourth time late in the half when WR Antonio Bryant caught a pass and fumbled, with CB Ricky Manning Jr. recovering. San Francisco averted a shutout in the fourth quarter on a 23-yard field goal by K Joe Nedney and a 16-yard TD pass from Smith to WR Antonio Bryant. QB Alex Smith finished 16 of 26 for 146 yards. RB Frank Gore rushed for 111 yards on 12 carries, thanks to a 53-yard run. The 49ers now stand at 2–5.

Week 9: vs. Minnesota Vikings 

With just 238 total yards and a host of dropped passes and mistakes, the Minnesota Vikings showed every negative effect of its injury problems and a short week of preparation after Monday night's loss to New England. But count QB Brad Johnson among those shocked by the 49ers sudden defensive acumen. San Francisco managed just 133 total yards with its own miserable offense, but got cohesive play from the same unit that gave up 41 points by halftime last week at Chicago. The Niners simplified their game plan and hung on, stopping Minnesota's final drive with 1:04 left. QB Alex Smith passed for just 105 yards and RB Frank Gore rushed for only 41 as San Francisco hung on for its eighth straight home victory since 1988 over the Vikings, now 4–4, who'll be shaking their heads all the way back to the Twin Cities after failing to mount any significant offensive attack. QB Brad Johnson passed for 136 yards but made three turnovers for the Vikings, whose final drive ended when WR Troy Williamson dropped an on-target pass on third down before S Mark Roman and CB Shawntae Spencer prevented WR Bethel Johnson from catching a desperate pass at the goal line. K Joe Nedney left Monster Park Sunday with a game ball after accounting for all of the 49ers scoring efforts. Nedney hit from 25, 30 and 51 yards out. The 51-yarder he had to kick twice after a game clock debacle. The 49ers, now 3–5, had just enough offense to back a shocking performance by their previously porous defense (which had allowed 150 points in its last four games), led by new starting LB and NFC Defensive Player of the Week Brandon Moore, who finished with 14 tackles and 1 sack. With the win, the 49ers advanced to 3–5.

Week 10: at Detroit Lions 

San Francisco kept Detroit in the game with missed opportunities, then made just enough plays for a rare two-game winning streak and its first road win. RB Frank Gore set a franchise record with 148 yards rushing in the first half and scored on a 61-yard run before leaving with a concussion. San Francisco led 13–3 at halftime after scoring on three of its first four drives, wishing it had a bigger lead after out gaining Detroit 247–102 yards and recovering a fumble without giving up a turnover. The 49ers had chances to go ahead big in the third quarter because Detroit had two turnovers on its first three plays, but they came away with only a field goal and a 13-point lead. Gore then caught a 7-yard pass, wobbled off the field and didn't return. QB Alex Smith's fumble midway through the third quarter set up a score that helped the Lions get back in the game. The 49ers drove down the field to set up K Joe Nedney's fourth field goal, a key score because it made Detroit go for a TD instead of kicking a tying field goal late in the game. S Keith Lewis intercepted QB Jon Kitna's pass at the 49ers' 2 with 2½ minutes left and San Francisco now 4–5 picked up the one first down it needed to seal the game, winning consecutive games for the second time since 2003. RB Frank Gore finished with career-high 159 yards rushing and San Francisco's QB Alex Smith was 14 of 20 for 136 yards with a fumble. WR Arnaz Battle caught six passes for 55 yards, and converted a third-and-4 on the final drive to allow the 49ers to run out the clock. The 49ers' defense again came up huge, allowing only 273 total offensive yards and forcing 4 turnovers. LB Brandon Moore was yet again the story, leading the team with 9 tackles, 2 sacks and forcing 2 turnovers. With the win, the 49ers advanced to 4–5.

Week 11: vs. Seattle Seahawks

In their first match up of the season versus division-leading rival Seattle Seahawks, the 49ers jumped to a 20–0 lead at halftime thanks to the combined efforts of running back Frank Gore and the defense. This was the first game back from injury for Seattle running back Shaun Alexander, and he was held to just 37 rush yards. On the other side of the ball, Frank Gore ran for a career-high 212 yards on his way to topping the 1,000-yard mark for the season. The Seahawks offense turned the ball over five times during the game, including three interceptions thrown by quarterback Seneca Wallace, two of which were picked off by San Francisco cornerback Walt Harris. Alex Smith, 49ers quarterback, threw one touchdown pass and also rushed for a one-yard touchdown, the first rushing touchdown of his career. The win elevated the 49ers to a .500 record, and put them just one game out of first place in their division, behind the 6–4 Seahawks.

On the final play of the game, a pass to Seattle's fullback Mack Strong, the Seahawks attempted to continue the play which was similar to The Play which made the Cal-Stanford rivalry famous. However 49ers Rookie Marcus Hudson recovered the lateral attempt and the game was over. In a reference to The Play, radio announcers on 107.7 The Bone declared "The band is NOT on the field"

Week 12: at St. Louis Rams

Riding high from their home upset over the Seahawks, the 49ers flew to the Edward Jones Dome for an NFC West rematch with their historic rival, the St. Louis Rams.  After a scoreless first quarter, the Niners trailed early.  In the second quarter, the Rams struck first with kicker Jeff Wilkins getting a 24-yard field goal, while RB Steven Jackson got a 36-yard TD run.  San Francisco would get on the board with RB Frank Gore getting a 12-yard TD run, yet Wilkins gave St. Louis a 51-yard field goal as time ran out on the half.  In the third quarter, the 49ers took the lead as QB Alex Smith completed a 1-yard TD pass to TE Eric Johnson for the only score of the period.  In the fourth quarter, kicker Joe Nedney gave the Niners a six-point lead with a 24-yard field goal.  However, the Rams would get the win with QB Marc Bulger completing a 5-yard TD pass to WR Kevin Curtis.  With the loss, the 49ers fell to 5–6.

Week 13: at New Orleans Saints

Hoping to rebound from their road loss to the Rams, the 49ers flew to the Louisiana Superdome for a Week 13 fight with the New Orleans Saints.  In the first quarter, the Niners took an early lead with kicker Joe Nedney nailing a 29-yard field goal for the only score of the period.  In the second quarter, the 49ers lost their lead with RB Reggie Bush's 1-yard and 8-yard TD runs.  In the third quarter, San Francisco came close with QB Alex Smith's 48-yard TD pass to WR Antonio Bryant, yet New Orleans gained some distance with kicker John Carney's 19-yard field goal and QB Drew Brees' 5-yard TD pass to Bush.  In the fourth quarter, the Saints wrapped things up with Bush's 10-yard run and Carney's 33-yard field goal.  With their second-straight loss, the 49ers fell to 5–7.

Week 14: vs. Green Bay Packers 

Trying to end their two-game skid, the 49ers went home for a Week 14 fight with the Green Bay Packers. In the first quarter, the Niners got an early lead with kicker Joe Nedney nailing a 24-yard field goal, yet the Packers gained the lead with QB Brett Favre's 36-yard TD pass to WR Ruvell Martin.  In the second quarter, San Francisco's troubles grew as Packers kicker Dave Rayner nailed a 23-yard field goal, while RB Ahman Green got a 1-yard TD run. The Niners would respond with Nedney kicking a 36-yard field goal.  In the third quarter, the 49ers had RB Frank Gore get a 1-yard TD run, yet Green Bay responded with Favre completing a 68-yard TD pass to WR Donald Driver.  In the fourth quarter, the Packers wrapped things up with Rayner kicking a 44-yard and a 21-yard field goal.  The Niners would get a touchdown, as QB Alex Smith completed a 52-yard TD pass to rookie TE Vernon Davis, yet a botched snap foiled the following PAT.  With their third-straight loss, the 49ers fell to 5–8.

Week 15: at Seattle Seahawks 

Trying to end a three-game skid, the 49ers flew to Qwest Field for an NFC West rematch with the Seattle Seahawks on Thursday night.  In the first quarter, the Niners started off bumpy as Seahawks RB Shaun Alexander got a 3-yard TD run for Seattle's early strike and the only score of the period.  In the second quarter, San Francisco would get a field goal before halftime as kicker Joe Nedney nailed one from 39 yards out.  After a scoreless third quarter, the Niners were in full force as QB Alex Smith completed an 8-yard TD pass to rookie TE Vernon Davis.  Afterwards, Smith would complete a 20-yard TD pass to RB Frank Gore.  Then, the 49ers wrapped the game up with Smith getting a very easy 18-yard QB sneak for a touchdown.  Seattle would get one more score as QB Matt Hasselbeck completed a 22-yard TD pass to TE Jerramy Stevens.  Fortunately, the Niners would get the win and the season sweep over the Seahawks.  With the win, the 49ers improved to 6–8

Week 16: vs. Arizona Cardinals 

Following their road win over the Seahawks, and hoping to clinch a playoff spot, the 49ers went home for an NFC West rematch with the Arizona Cardinals.  In the first quarter, the Niners struck first with kicker Joe Nedney getting a 49-yard field goal, yet the Cardinals took the lead with kicker Neil Rackers getting a 25-yard field goal, along with RB Marcel Shipp's 5-yard TD run.  In the second quarter, things continued to get worse for the 49ers as QB Matt Leinart completed a 6-yard to WR Larry Fitzgerald, along with Rackers nailing a 39-yard field goal.  The Niners would be able get a field goal before halftime as Nedney kicked from 32 yards out.  In the third quarter, San Francisco started to come back as RB Frank Gore got a 2-yard TD run for the only score of the period.  In the fourth quarter, Arizona increased its lead as Rackers was awarded a missed 37-yard field goal and was successful in kicking a 32-yard field goal.  Even though Gore managed to get a 1-yard TD run, the Niners fell short of a comeback.  With the loss, the 49ers fell to 6–9, securing them their fourth consecutive losing season.

Week 17: at Denver Broncos 

Trying to end their season on a positive note, the 49ers flew to Invesco Field at Mile High to take on the playoff hopeful Denver Broncos.  In the first quarter, the Broncos struck first with kicker Jason Elam getting a 22-yard field goal for the only score of the period.  In the second quarter, Denver continued its dominance with Elam kicking a 21-yard field goal, while CB Champ Bailey returned an interception 70 yards for a touchdown.  The Niners would get a field goal before halftime as kicker Joe Nedney got one from 46 yards out.  In the third quarter, San Francisco took the lead as QB Alex Smith completed a 32-yard TD pass to RB Moran Norris, while CB Walt Harris returned an interception 28 yards for a touchdown. The Broncos would sneak close with Elam kicking a 22-yard field goal.  In the fourth quarter, Nedney gave the Niners a little cushion with a 29-yard and a 46-yard field goal.  However, Denver managed to tie the game with QB Jay Cutler completing a 9-yard TD pass to TE Tony Scheffler. The game would go to overtime, where both sides fought hard and fierce as the period wore on. San Francisco eventually prevailed with two minutes remaining as Nedney helped knock the Broncos out of the playoff picture with a game-winning 36-yard field goal. With the win, the 49ers ended their season at 7–9.

Standings

References

San Francisco 49ers
San Francisco 49ers seasons
San Francisco 49ers season
2006 in San Francisco